In the sport of cricket, a century is a score of one hundred or more runs by a batsman in a single innings. In a women's Twenty20 match, each team plays a single innings, which is restricted to a maximum of 20 overs. A women's Twenty20 International (WT20I) is an international cricket match between two teams, each having WT20I status, as determined by the International Cricket Council (ICC), the sport's world governing body. The Twenty20 format was originally introduced by the England and Wales Cricket Board for the men's county cricket competition, with the first matches contested on 13 June 2003 between the English counties in the Twenty20 Cup. The first women's Twenty20 International match took place on 5 August 2004 when New Zealand defeated England by nine runs at the County Cricket Ground in Hove. This match was held six months before the first men's Twenty20 International, which was contested between Australia and New Zealand in February 2005.

The first century in a WT20I match was scored by Deandra Dottin of the West Indies. Dottin posted 112 not out against South Africa in the opening match of the 2010 ICC Women's World Twenty20 at Warner Park in Basseterre. Dottin's innings is the fastest WT20I century (off 38 deliveries), and is the WT20I century with the highest strike rate (248.88). Batting at number six, Dottin's innings is one of two occasions where a WT20I century has been scored by a player batting at number five or lower. The other was when India's Harmanpreet Kaur, who came in at number five, posted 103 against New Zealand during the 2018 ICC Women's World Twenty20. Dottin, Danni Wyatt of England, Australia's Meg Lanning and Beth Mooney, Fatuma Kibasu of Tanzania and Esha Oza of the United Arab Emirates are the only players to have achieved the feat two times. Both of Wyatt's WT20I centuries were scored in the second innings of the match. The only other instance was when Sri Lanka's Chamari Atapattu made 113 against Australia during the WT20I series in September 2019. Sri Lanka lost the match, and it was one of two occurrences where a team was defeated in spite of a player scoring a century. This match was also one of five occasions where two WT20I centuries were scored in the same match.

The highest individual score of 161 not out in WT20Is was achieved by Bahrain's Deepika Rasangika against Saudi Arabia in March 2022. At 38 years and 99 days, she was also the oldest player to score a WT20I century. At the age of 16 years and 233 days, Uganda's Prosscovia Alako became the youngest player to score a WT20I century when she made 116 against Mali at the 2019 Kwibuka Women's T20 Tournament in Rwanda. Australia's Alyssa Healy is the only designated wicket-keeper to have scored a WT20I century.

, a total of 38 centuries have been scored by 32 different players, from 20 national teams, after over 1,200 WT20I matches.

Key

Centuries

Notes

References

Women's Twenty20 International
!
Centuries